CHMN-FM is a Canadian radio station serving Canmore and Banff, Alberta at 106.5 FM, and airs an adult contemporary format under the name 106.5 Mountain FM.

History
The station began broadcasting in 1983 as CFHC on the AM band at 1450 kHz in Canmore and CFHC-1 at 1340 kHz in Banff. CFHC was a semi-satellite of sister station CFAC in Calgary until 1992.

CFHC has been through different ownerships and programming. On July 10, 1997, CFHC was given approval from the CRTC to convert to the FM band to 106.5 MHz in Canmore, becoming CHMN-FM, with a rebroadcast transmitter on the same frequency at 106.5 FM in Banff (CHMN-FM-1). After the station moved to the FM band, the old AM signals were discontinued.

Both transmitters were briefly known as CJMT-FM, until it was changed back to its current callsign CHMN.

References

External links
 106.5 Mountain FM
 CHMN history - Canadian Communications Foundation as CFHC
 AM to FM CRTC Decision 1997
 CHMN - most recent licence renewal CRTC July 2003

Hmn
Hmn
Hmn
Canmore, Alberta
Radio stations established in 1983
1983 establishments in Alberta